General Bernard may refer to:

Denis Bernard (British Army officer) (1882–1956), British Army lieutenant general
George Bernard (died 1820), British Army general
Reuben F. Bernard (1834–1903), U.S. Army brigadier general
Simon Bernard (1779–1839), U.S. Army brigadier general and French Army lieutenant general

See also
Friedrich Bernhard (1888–1945), German Wehrmacht lieutenant general